Mayda Velasco is a physicist and professor in the Department of Physics and Astronomy at Northwestern University.  She works in experimental particle physics and is a leading member of the CMS Collaboration at the CERN LHC.  She founded COFI and is its first director. She is a pioneer in the physics potential of photon colliders.

Early life and education

Velasco went to high school at Academia Maria Reina in San Juan, Puerto Rico.  She obtained her undergraduate degree from the University of Puerto Rico (Rio Piedras) and attended graduate school in physics at Northwestern University where she obtained her PhD in 1995 with Donald Miller and Ralph Segel as advisors.

Research activities

Velasco's research career spans a wide range within experimental particle physics.
She obtained her Ph.D. by making the first measurement of the spin structure function g2(x) using data collected by the Spin Muon Collaboration.  She became a CERN Post-Doctoral Fellow in 1996 with Heinrich Wahl as her advisor. At CERN, she joined the NA48 experiment Collaboration. This experiment made precision measurements of neutral kaons especially as regards CP violation.  It also investigated rare kaon decays.  Velasco formed her own collaboration to perform the NA59 experiment at CERN.  This experiment demonstrated the channeling of high energy particles in bent crystals and studied the production of circularly-polarized high-energy photons. This topic connected well with her pioneering work in the physics potential of photon colliders, which she advocated at the Snowmass Meeting in 2001.  Following that meeting, she promoted the Compact Linear Collider (CLIC) accelerator at CERN.

Velasco joined the faculty in the Department of Physics and Astronomy at Northwestern University in 1999.  At that time she joined the Main injector oscillation neutrino search (MINOS) Collaboration to study neutrino oscillations.  She left MINOS to join the CMS Collaboration at CERN - one of the two general-purpose experiments at the CERN LHC—where she continues to play a leadership role.  Her work has an important impact on the current understanding of the Higgs boson: she spearheaded the rare Z+photon decay channel which, in principle, can distinguish the standard model Higgs boson from those beyond the standard model.

Awards and distinctions

Velasco was awarded a Fellowship from the Alfred P. Sloan Foundation in 2002.  She also received a Woodrow Wilson Fellowship from the Mellon Foundation and she is a recipient of the CERN Achievement Award. She holds the UNESCO Chair on Fundamental and Interdisciplinary Physics Professorship at Northwestern University since 2018. This position was established in support and recognition of COFI, which Velasco founded in 2014.

Velasco serves as a member  of the High Energy Physics Advisory Panel (HEPAP) that advises the United States Department of Energy.

Velasco was given the Dean's Award for Diversity in 2015.

Colegio de Física Fundamental e Interdiciplinaria de las Ámericas (COFI) 

Velasco founded the Colegio de Física Fundamental e Interdiciplinaria de las Ámericas (COFI) in San Juan, Puerto Rico in 2014. COFI hosts full-time students and scientists from Puerto Rico, the continental United States, and abroad to collaborate on emerging fundamental science projects. The institute also provides advance training programs and public lectures. She is its first General Director.

See also

History of women in Puerto Rico
List of Puerto Ricans
Puerto Rican scientists and inventors

References

External links
Northwestern faculty page

1966 births
21st-century American physicists
Living people
Puerto Rican scientists
Northwestern University alumni
Northwestern University faculty
American women physicists
People associated with CERN
Puerto Rican women scientists
American women academics
21st-century American women scientists